Xenocyprinae, is a contentious subfamily of the family Cyprinidae, the carp and minnow family, originally from eastern Asia.

Genera
The 5th edition of Fishes of the World assigns the follow general to this subfamily:

Aristichthys Oshima, 1919
Hypophthalmichthys Bleeker, 1860
Xenocypris Günther, 1868

The taxonomy of the Cyprinids is somewhat contentious and other authorities differ with the above, for example the following genera are assigned to the subfamily Xenocyprinae on Fishbase or the 2018 phylogenetic study:

Distoechodon Peters, 1881
Hypophthalmichthys Bleeker, 1860
Metzia Jordan & Thompson, 1914
Plagiognathops Berg, 1907
Pseudobrama Bleeker, 1870
Xenocypris Günther, 1868

Taxonomy
Cyprinidae is a large, widespread and diverse family of, mainly, freshwater ray-finned fish and the taxonomy of the family has not yet been fully resolved and the subfamilies do not appear to have a single accepted taxonomy. Some authorities place the genera above in the larger subfamilies Oxygasterinae or Xenocypridinae.  However,  genetic and morphological studies have supported the view that the five general currently assigned to the subfamily Xenocyprinae form a monophyletic grouping.

References

 
Ray-finned fish subfamilies
Taxa named by Albert Günther